This is a list of documentary channels, including channels that have been affected by "channel drift". It also contains channels accused of a biased point of view.

List

See also
 Channel drift

References

 
Lists of television channels by content
Television channels